Vibing Up the Senile Man (Part One) is the second studio album by English rock band Alternative TV, released in March 1979 by record label Deptford Fun City. On this album, the band followed an even more experimental and avant-garde approach than on The Image Has Cracked (1978).

Recording 

The album's tracks were all reportedly recorded in a single take.

Musical style 

Regarding its musical style, Alternative TV frontman Mark Perry recalled: "There are free jazz influences; I'd got into the Art Ensemble of Chicago, Sun Ra [...] I'd moved into this house with an amazing music room – pianos, clarinets, you name it – and we'd always be picking up stuff from junk shops."

Reception 

According to Simon Reynolds in Rip It Up and Start Again: Postpunk 1978-1984, the album received a "uniformly hostile" response from reviewers upon its release. Trouser Press described the record as being "up the pseudo-avant creek without a paddle".

In his retrospective review of the album, Dean McFarlane of AllMusic noted that "... Mark Perry and friends did to punk exactly what the movement had intended for the establishment", asking, "... who would have expected a follow-up [to The Image Has Cracked] as avant-garde abstraction ...?" He goes on to state that "Vibing Up the Senile Man became closer to free improvisation and avant-garde jazz without a punk anthem in sight ..." and continuing that what it "... represents two decades later is a door opening on multi-faceted post-rock music -- which draws on avant-garde, noise, and jazz and arguably makes more sense in the context of year 2000 as a musical treasure much more than in 1980 ...".

Legacy 

Paul Hegarty, in Noise Music: A History, described the album as "forming the bridge into industrial music".

The record was placed at number 19 on Mojo's list of readers' choice of 50 "Weirdest Albums".

Track listing

Personnel 
 Alternative TV

 Mark Perry – all other instruments, production
 Dennis Burns – all other instruments, production

 Additional personnel

 Mick Linehan – guitar on "Release the Natives" and "The Good Missionary"
 Steve Jameson – third voice on "Smile in the Day"
 Genesis P. Orridge - percussion on "Release the Natives", "Serpentine Gallery" and "Graves of Deluxe Green"

 Technical

 Wally Brill – engineering, production, "vibing"
 Jill Furmanovsky – cover photography, sleeve layout

References

External links 

 

1979 albums
Experimental music albums
Alternative TV albums